Jesenica is a settlement below Mount Kojca northwest of Cerkno in the traditional Littoral region of Slovenia.

References

External links
Jesenica on Geopedia

Populated places in the Municipality of Cerkno